Tim Weiner (born June 20, 1956) is an American reporter and author.  He is the author of five books and co-author of a sixth, and winner of the Pulitzer Prize and National Book Award.

Biography
Weiner graduated from Columbia University with a Bachelor of Arts in history and from the Columbia University Graduate School of Journalism. He worked for The New York Times from 1993 to 2009 as a foreign correspondent in Mexico, Afghanistan, Pakistan and Sudan and as a national security correspondent in Washington, DC.

Weiner won the 1988 Pulitzer Prize for National Reporting as an investigative reporter at The Philadelphia Inquirer, for his articles on the black budget spending at the Pentagon and the CIA. His book Blank Check: The Pentagon's Black Budget is based on that newspaper series.

He won the National Book Award in Nonfiction for his 2007 book Legacy of Ashes: The History of the CIA.

In 2012, Weiner published Enemies: A History of the FBI, which traces the history of the FBI's secret intelligence operations from the bureau's creation in the early 20th century through its ongoing role in the war on terrorism.

His latest book, The Folly and the Glory: America, Russia, and Political Warfare, 1945–2020, was published in 2020. Among other things it describes how the CIA helped Joseph Mobutu as a reliable anti-communist in Congo, or how Ronald Reagan's encounter with Pope John Paul II led to a covert program to support the Polish Solidarity movement. Timothy Naftali cautions that Weiner may be overstating Putin's influence on the 2016 Presidential elections: "The Trump phenomenon, which the Russians abetted but did not create, emerged from a broken nation." This is also the assessment of Rajan Menon who, in his review for The New York Times, furthermore contends that he found no evidence supporting Weiner's suggestion that NATO expansion toward the Russian border in the 1990s sprang from the mind of Anthony Lake.

Books

 Blank Check: The Pentagon's Black Budget. Warner Books, 1990. . Based on a series of Pulitzer Prize-winning articles.
 Betrayal: The Story of Aldrich Ames, an American Spy, with Neil A. Lewis & David Johnston. Random House, 1995. .
 Legacy of Ashes: The History of the CIA. Anchor Books, 2008. .
 Enemies: A History of the FBI. Random House, 2012. .
 One Man Against The World: The Tragedy of Richard Nixon. Macmillan, 2015. .
 The Folly and the Glory: America, Russia, and Political Warfare, 1945–2020. Henry Holt and Company, 2020. .

References

External links

Interviews on NPR
 Interview by the Pritzker Military Museum & Library, September 20, 2007.
 Tim Weiner at Library of Congress Authorities with catalog records.

1956 births
Living people
American male journalists
Columbia University Graduate School of Journalism alumni
National Book Award winners
The New York Times writers
Place of birth missing (living people)
Pulitzer Prize for National Reporting winners
Columbia College (New York) alumni
Historians of the Central Intelligence Agency
People from White Plains, New York